The Mausoleum of Harun al-Rashid is a joint mausoleum of the Abbasid Caliph Harun al-Rashid with Ali al-Ridha in the city of Mashhad in Iran.

Harun al-Rashid 
Abu Jaafar Harun bin Muhammad al-Mahdi bin Abi Jaafar al-Mansur (149–193 AH), the fifth Abbasid Caliph. He was born in the city of Rayy in the year 149 AH (766) and died in the city of Tus (Mashhad today) in 193 AH (809).

The death and burial of Harun al-Rashid 
Al-Rasheed, despite all his great deeds, felt the lack of resourcefulness in face of competitions and agendas within his kingdom; the Al-Baramkeh catastrophe was not a solution to the situation. At the end of his days, he became lonely and ill. Hiding his illness from people, he uncovered his belly to one of his friends, displaying a band of silk on it. Al-Rasheed said to his friend: “This is an injury that I kept from all people. All including my sons are waiting for my death”.  Al-Rasheed's illness got worse on his way to Khorasan to end the revolt of Rafi’ Ibn al-Layth. He died in the city of Tus (the current city of Mashhad in northeastern Iran) and was buried there in Jumada al-Thani in 193 AH / 809 AD.

Ibn Battuta and the mausoleum 
The traveler Ibn Battuta described the shrine by saying: The honored scene has a great dome inside a corner adjacent to a school and a mosque, all of which are well built. In front of this is the tomb of Harun al-Rashid, and on it is a bench on which they place the candlesticks.

Shrine location 
The shrine is located in the center of the city of Mashhad, 924 km from the capital, Tehran. The scene is surrounded by a roundabout branching to all parts of the city of Mashhad. The scene is bordered on the north by Noghan, from the south by Imam Reza Street and Bayt al-Maqdis Roundabout, and from the southwest by Nawab Safavi Street From the northeast, Ayatollah Shirazi Street.

Resources 

809 deaths
Harun al-Rashid
World Heritage Sites in Iran
Abbasid architecture
Safavid architecture
Mausoleums in Iran
Islamic antiquities